Gravisca (Cravsca in Etruscan and Graviscae Latin) was the port of the Etruscan city of Tarquinii, situated 8 km west of the city center.

The Etruscan settlement, occupied ca. sixth to third centuries BC, had four principal occupational phases from ca. 600 to 250 B.C. It was superseded by the establishment of a colonia of Roman citizenship at the site in 181 BC. The port functioned as an emporion and there is ample evidence for merchants and perhaps Greek artisans based at the site. The cults of numerous Greek gods, including Aphrodite, Hera, Demeter, and Apollo, are attested.

References

Roman sites in Lazio
Etruscan sites
Archaeological sites in Lazio